Guardia Perticara is a town and comune in the province of Potenza, in the Southern Italian region of Basilicata. It has 519 people.

References

Cities and towns in Basilicata